Modjeska House, also known as Arden, is a house designed by Stanford White in Modjeska Canyon, California. It is significant for being the only surviving home of Helena Modjeska, a Shakespearean actress and Polish patriot. The property is located in a live oak grove on the banks of Santiago Creek in Modjeska Canyon, California.

History
Modjeska came to America with her husband Count Karol Bozenta Chłapowski in 1876 from Poland, and created a retreat for when she was not performing on stage. To design a large Victorian country house, she hired one of America's leading architects, Stanford White. They named it "Arden" after the forest setting of Shakespeare's play As You Like It and planted gardens with olive trees, palms, English yews, white lilac, and crown of thorns. It was their home from 1888 until 1906.

Post-Modjeska years
After the property was sold, the romance associated with Modjeska's life attracted developers who marketed parcels of the property for vacation homes.  In 1908, Gustave A. Schweiger bought the home and operated it as a bed and breakfast. In 1922, local Rotary groups discussed buying the property to use as a country club. In 1923, the Walker family of Long Beach purchased parcels of land in the canyon that included the Modjeska house and its surrounding wooded area.

Historic site
Modjeska House was declared a California Historical Landmark in 1935.

In 1986, the Orange County Harbors, Beaches and Parks Authority purchased the 14.4-acre  property for $1 million and established it as a historical site. A major restoration occurred before the site could be opened to the public. The original house had no indoor plumbing or utilities. A limited number of visitors are allowed on tours. Directions to the park are given after making reservations.

It was declared a National Historic Landmark in 1990.

The house was featured in Visiting... with Huell Howser Episode 920.

Marker
Marker at the site reads:
Famous as the home of Madame Modjeska, one of the world's great actresses, it was designed by Stanford White in 1888 on property called the Forest of Arden. Sold soon after her retirement, it remains a monument to the woman who contributed immeasurably to the cultural life of Orange County.  Erected by California State Park Commission. (Marker Number 205.)

Gallery

See also
California Historical Landmarks in Orange County, California

References

External links

 
 O.C. History Roundup: Modjeska's home, in the Forest of Arden
 Infographic: Map of the Modjeska estate 'Arden'

Houses in Orange County, California
Historic house museums in California
Museums in Orange County, California
Houses completed in 1888
California Historical Landmarks
National Historic Landmarks in California
Houses on the National Register of Historic Places in California
National Register of Historic Places in Orange County, California
Santa Ana Mountains
Stanford White buildings
Queen Anne architecture in California
Victorian architecture in California